The 1997–98 NBA season  was the 28th season for the Portland Trail Blazers in the National Basketball Association. During the off-season, the Blazers signed free agents Brian Grant, and Vincent Askew, and hired former Milwaukee Bucks General Manager and head coach Mike Dunleavy as their new coach. After losing their season opener, the Blazers went on a five-game winning streak, which ended with a 140–139 quadruple overtime home loss to the Phoenix Suns on November 14, 1997. The Blazers continued to play above .500 for the remainder of the season, holding a 26–20 record at the All-Star break.

At midseason, the team traded Kenny Anderson along with Gary Trent, and rookie guard Alvin Williams to the Toronto Raptors in exchange for Damon Stoudamire, Carlos Rogers and Walt Williams; Anderson never played for the Raptors, as he was soon traded to the Boston Celtics. The Blazers later on signed free agent Gary Grant in March, while Askew was released to free agency after 30 games. The Blazers finished with a 46–36 record, fourth in the Pacific Division and sixth in the Western Conference, making their sixteenth straight trip to the postseason and 21st in 22 years. Isaiah Rider led the team in scoring with 19.7 points per game, while Arvydas Sabonis averaged 16.0 points and 10.0 rebounds per game, Rasheed Wallace provided the team with 14.6 points and 6.2 rebounds per game, and Brian Grant contributed 12.1 points and 9.1 rebounds per game, despite only playing 61 games due to a leg injury.

For the second straight season, the Blazers were pitted against the Los Angeles Lakers in the Western Conference First Round of the NBA Playoffs, and the result was identical to that of the previous year, as Portland fell one game to three. It was also the sixth consecutive year that the Blazers lost in the opening round of the playoffs.

The Blazers also set an ignominious record during a road game against the Indiana Pacers. The teams' February 27, 1998 game ended with a Pacer win by the embarrassing score of 124–59, the only time in NBA history where a team has had their score doubled.

NBA Draft

Roster

Roster Notes
 Small forward Vincent Askew was waived on March 24.
 Small forward Dontonio Wingfield was waived on March 5.

Regular season

Season standings

z - clinched division title
y - clinched division title
x - clinched playoff spot

Record vs. opponents

Game log

Playoffs

| home_wins = 1
| home_losses = 1
| road_wins = 0
| road_losses = 2
}}
|- align="center" bgcolor="#ffcccc"
| 1
| April 24
| @ L.A. Lakers
| L 102–104
| Isaiah Rider (25)
| Brian Grant (12)
| Damon Stoudamire (10)
| Great Western Forum17,505
| 0–1
|- align="center" bgcolor="#ffcccc"
| 2
| April 26
| @ L.A. Lakers
| L 99–108
| Isaiah Rider (24)
| three players tied (7)
| Damon Stoudamire (14)
| Great Western Forum17,505
| 0–2
|- align="center" bgcolor="#ccffcc"
| 3
| April 28
| L.A. Lakers
| W 99–94
| Rider, Stoudamire (18)
| Brian Grant (12)
| Damon Stoudamire (6)
| Rose Garden21,558
| 1–2
|- align="center" bgcolor="#ffcccc"
| 4
| April 30
| L.A. Lakers
| L 99–110
| Damon Stoudamire (24)
| Brian Grant (12)
| Damon Stoudamire (8)
| Rose Garden21,558
| 1–3
|-

Player statistics

NOTE: Please write the players statistics in alphabetical order by last name.

Season

Playoffs

Awards and records

Transactions

References

Portland Trail Blazers seasons
Portland Trail Blazers 1997
Portland Trail Blazers 1997
Port
Port
Port